Upendra Ghimire is a Nepalese politician belonging to CPN (Unified Socialist). He is also serving as member of Provincial Assembly. 

He is currently serving as Minister for Transportation Management and Communications of Province No. 1.

Electoral history

2017 Nepalese provincial elections

See also 

 CPN (Unified Socialist)

References 

Communist Party of Nepal (Unified Socialist) politicians
Year of birth missing (living people)
Living people
Provincial cabinet ministers of Nepal
Members of the Provincial Assembly of Koshi Province